Stephen Handcock (1657 - 1719) was an Anglican priest in Ireland during the late 17th and early 18th centuries.

Handcock was born in County Meath and educated at Trinity College, Dublin. He was appointed Dean of Clonmacnoise  in 1689 and Dean of Kilmacduagh in 1700, a post he held until his death.

References

Alumni of Trinity College Dublin
Deans of Clonmacnoise
Deans of Kilmacduagh
People from County Meath
18th-century Irish Anglican priests
1657 births
1719 deaths